The WTA Tier I events are part of the elite tour for professional women's tennis organised by the WTA called the WTA Tour.

Tournaments

Results

Tournament details

Doha

Singles

Doubles

Indian Wells

Singles

Doubles

Miami

Singles

Doubles

Charleston

Singles

Doubles

Berlin

Singles

Doubles

Rome

Singles

Doubles

Montreal

Singles

Doubles

Tokyo

Singles

Doubles

Moscow

Singles

Doubles

See also 
 WTA Tier I events
 2008 WTA Tour
 2008 ATP Masters Series
 2008 ATP Tour

References

External links
 Women's Tennis Association (WTA) official website
 International Tennis Federation (ITF) official website

WTA 1000 tournaments

 Tier 1